Seyyedabad-e Ilkhani (also Romanized as Seyyedābād-e Īlkhānī; also known as Seyyedābād-e Īlkhānī Pūr) is a village in Hoseynabad Rural District, Esmaili District, Anbarabad County, Kerman Province, Iran. At the 2006 census, its population was 646, in 133 families.

References 

Populated places in Anbarabad County